Part-Primitiv is a studio album by Section 25. It was released in June 2007 at West Orange studios in Preston. The two tracks featuring Jenny Ross, "Dream" and "Better Make Your Mind Up", were reworked versions of demos which had been recorded in the Temple of Din - a small home studio in Poulton-le-Fylde.

Track listing
All songs written by Section 25.
"Winterland I" – 3:54
"Can't Let Go" – 5:06
"Poppy Fields" – 4:06
"She's So Pretty" – 3:39
"Dream" – 4:14
"Powerbase" – 4:17
"Roma" – 3:20
"Better Make Your Mind Up" – 4:04
"Gene" – 3:09
"Cry" – 3:12
"Ludus Cantus" – 2:17
"Nick" – 3:06
"Winterland II" – 4:08

Personnel
Section 25
Larry Cassidy - vocals, guitar
Vin Cassidy - drums, electronics
Jenny Ross - vocals
Ian Butterworth - guitar, electronics
Roger Wikeley - bass guitar, electronics, harmonica
Technical
Alan Gregson - engineer, additional production

References

External links
 LTM Records

2007 albums
Section 25 albums